Jonsmoen is a surname. Notable people with the surname include:

Ola Jonsmoen (born 1932), Norwegian educator, poet, novelist, and children's writer
Unni-Lise Jonsmoen (born 1936), Norwegian illustrator and children's writer, wife of Ola

Norwegian-language surnames